This Is England '90 is a 2015 British TV drama mini-series written by Shane Meadows and Jack Thorne and produced by Warp Films. A spin-off from the 2006 film This Is England, it is also a sequel to the series This Is England '86 and This Is England '88. This Is England '90 was originally due in late 2012, but in July 2012, Meadows announced that the production had been put on hold in order for him to complete his documentary about reunited Manchester rock band The Stone Roses, and the actors were still waiting for confirmation as to when filming would start.

In March 2014, Meadows confirmed that shooting would start later in the year although he had not yet finished the script. He also confirmed that this will likely be the final series of the saga.

In October 2014, Channel 4 announced that filming had begun in Sheffield and the series would be made up of four episodes due to air in 2015. On 31 July 2015, the first trailer for the series was released to YouTube, on the Channel 4 channel. The series premiered on 13 September 2015.

Overview
This Is England '90 looks at rave culture and the 1990 FIFA World Cup. It features Shaun, Kelly, Trev, Harvey and Gadget who are involved in the rave scene. Combo is released from prison after serving his sentence for the manslaughter of Mick in This Is England '86. Flip and Higgy from the moped gang in This Is England '86 are more prominently featured in the cast in this series.

Similar to the film and the two previous series, '90 featured a montage of the era at the beginning of the first episode, featuring the resignation of Margaret Thatcher in November 1990 which is set to the 1988 song "There She Goes" by The La's (which was re-released in October 1990).  The music of The Stone Roses was also featured prominently.

Each episode is set against a different season of the year, starting with Spring, and having significant time pass between each episode.

Production
Much of the filming took place in Sheffield, particularly in the Gleadless area, with the Park Hill flats serving as the location for Harvey and Gadget's flat.

Episodes

Spring
Milky, Woody, Lol and the gang are all reunited in the classic era of 1990s rave culture, Following on from the events of 1988, Woody and Lol are back together and have a little baby, Jimmy. Lol has a job running the local school kitchen with Chrissie, Kelly and Trev working as dinnerladies, while Woody stays at home with the kids. 

Gadget, Harvey, Kelly, Trev and Shaun are all following the Madchester rave scene, smoking cannabis in bongs and taking whatever drugs they have, usually provided by Harvey who appears to have become a low-level dealer on the estate.

After a conversation with Cynthia about the events of '88, Shaun goes to find Smell who dumped him in '88 for cheating on her with Fay after the Christmas production at college. When he finally managed to find her ending a day at her new college course, Shaun tells Smell he has missed her and invites her to a Manchester-themed discothèque at the town hall but Smell is reluctant to go, then tells him she has met someone else, which hits him hard, prompting his crying.

Meanwhile, Woody and Lol have gone round to Woody's parents' house where there is a certain surprise for Woody, after seeing that his ex – Jennifer – is staying over, after a row with her parents. A certain blast from the past bursts out of the cupboard... Mr Squires, Woody's old boss. He offers Woody a partnership but Woody gets upset and angry because he doesn't want to end up like his dad and then an argument erupts.

Later Shaun is seen round at Harvey and Gadget's flat taking bong hits. Shaun tells the lads what happened when he saw Smell and then Harvey jokes about it, impersonating Smell and cheering up Shaun.

Afterwards Woody, Lol and the gang are all round at Lol's mums talking about the disco, then Kelly and Trev persuade Lol to attend so the girls get ready and head off. Shaun, Harvey and Gadget are heading into the disco when Shaun suddenly starts suffering with dizziness and nausea, a reaction to the bong hits he previously took, but Harvey gives him some speed to perk him up for the night.

The girls meet the lads in the disco and "Fools Gold" starts to play and everybody gets pumped up and raves. After the disco a Goth-like lad called Harrison goes over to Shaun to tell him that he is Smell's boyfriend, and he is sorry Smell can't make it, but then Shaun, feeling disrespected in front of his mates, over-reacts and a skirmish occurs.

After things have calmed down everyone goes home and we see Woody asleep and Lol getting ready to go to bed.

Summer
Shaun, Harvey, Gadget, Kelly and Trev all pack into a small car, venturing into the countryside in search of a rave. On the way they meet Flip and Higgy, whose car has broken down, so all seven squeeze into one car. After a long day trying to find their intended venue, they give up and begin to camp out in the woods for the night. In the distance, they hear the sound of drums and assume it's the rave they've been trying to find. Walking down into a field they stumble upon a commune of new-age travellers and spontaneously join their party. Shaun finds comfort with an attractive older lady, whilst Kelly, already drunk on alcohol and high on Ecstasy, is encouraged by three older men to smoke drugs before having sex with them in a trailer. After waking, whilst watching the sunrise, a tearful Kelly confides in Gadget "I'm a fucking slag Gadget...I just do what I fucking want, Gadge, that's the fucking problem".

Lol, Woody and Milky stay at home, spending the afternoon having a barbecue in their front garden. When the phone rings in the evening, Lol says it is her mother and takes the call in another room. She later tells Woody that it wasn't her mother, but it was Combo, who is about to be released from prison and needs a place to stay.

Autumn
Lol and Woody invite everyone round to their house for Sunday dinner. After the meal, they inform everyone that it wasn't Combo who killed Mick, but Lol. Lol also tells her sister Kelly that Mick raped Trev the night before he was killed. Kelly refuses to believe that her father was a bad person. Lol and Woody continue with the news that Combo is about to be released from prison and has nowhere to stay. Once it becomes clear that Combo will be staying with them, Milky refuses to let his daughter stay under the same roof as the racist man who beat him half to death. Shaun's place at college is reconsidered and he gains a place on the photography course, much to Cynthia and Sandhu's excitement. Woody proposes to Lol, and Combo moves in with them, meanwhile Milky prepares an attack on Combo.

Winter
While Lol and Woody plan their wedding, Milky plans revenge against Combo who is now about to start his first day working at a local community centre. Harvey catches Kelly smoking heroin in his bathroom and instructs her to leave immediately. When Gadget finds out he has a blazing row with Harvey before leaving to find Kelly.

Shaun has started his photography course at college, making use of his new camera bought by his mother and Mr. Sandhu. He and fellow photography student Juliette begin an assignment together. While out taking photographs, the pair meet a distressed Gadget as he looks for Kelly. Shaun joins Gadget in the search. They eventually find her in an isolated spot where her father's ashes were scattered. Both offer to find her a place to stay, but she refuses their help, mocks Gadget's pity and leaves with a man friend who is unknown to Shaun and Gadget, and who Kelly is later seen living with.

Combo enjoys his first day at work at the community centre. After saying he is going out for lunch, he is surprised by Milky waiting outside, wanting to go for a cup of tea and a talk "man to man" about the racist attack that Combo launched on him seven years ago that left him clinging to life. During a long drive into the countryside, anxious that several cafés have been left behind, Combo becomes suspicious.

Sitting in a cafe, Combo tells Milky he was a coward for what he did, and that he was secretly jealous of the love Milky had from his family. Milky's relative, Rudy (played by Vauxhall Jermaine), arrives with other family members and it soon transpires that promises were made to avenge the attack. Combo apologises to Milky again, saying he hopes Milky will one day forgive him. He is then ushered into the back of a van. At some disused dockside buildings, Combo is handed over to two white men. Crying and screaming he is dragged away. He is not seen again.

Two months later, at the reception after Woody and Lol's church wedding ceremony, Smell, who is with her boyfriend Harrison, tries to create a scene after meeting Shaun's new girlfriend, Juliette, whom she describes as a "hot mess". Her angry behaviour mirrors Shaun's reaction to his meeting with Harrison at the disco. 'Missing' Kelly is then seen sitting by herself in a room in a run down drugs-den.

During a quiet interlude from the wedding festivities, when alone in the snooker room of the working men's club, Lol asks Milky if he has seen or heard from Combo. He evades the questions, reacting in a non-committal way, rather uneasily. Lol has noticed that Milky is subdued and not quite himself, and is suspicious that Milky was involved in the disappearance. 

Kelly leaves the house and walks to her sister's wedding reception. She attempts to leave a card and disappear before she is seen by anyone, but is spotted by Lol. The two sisters reconcile during a deep conversation and eventually Kelly agrees to stay and join in the wedding celebrations, becoming re-united with her family and friends.

The episode ends with a wedding-dance party scene containing most of the major characters from the film and television series, such as Meggy and Pob. The happy montage is intercut with a lone Milky standing at the bar brooding over his part in Combo's disappearance.

Cast

 Thomas Turgoose as Shaun Fields
 Vicky McClure as Frances Lorraine "Lol" Jenkins
 Joe Gilgun as Richard "Woody" Woodford
 Stephen Graham as Andrew "Combo" Gascoigne
 Andrew Shim as Michael "Milky"
 Chanel Cresswell as Kelly Jenkins
 Danielle Watson as Trev
 Lyra Mae Thomas as Lisa
 Andrew Ellis as Gary "Gadget" Flowers
 Michael Socha as Harvey
 Rosamund Hanson as Michelle "Smell"
 Haris Salihovic as Harrison
 Jo Hartley as Cynthia Fields
 Kriss Dosanjh as Mr. Sandhu
 Katherine Dow Blyton as Christine "Chrissy" Jenkins
 Steve Brody as Richard Woodford, Sr.
 Rebecca Manley as Barbara Woodford
 Stacey Sampson as Jennifer
 Perry Fitzpatrick as Flip
 Joe Dempsie as Higgy
 Helen Behan as Helen
 Poppy Corby-Tuech as Juliette
 William Travis as Mr. Squires
 Johnny Harris as Michael "Mick" Jenkins
 Perry Benson as Ronald "Meggy" Megford
 George Newton as Banjo
 Vauxhall Jermaine as Rudy 
 Hannah Walters as Trudy
 Kieran Hardcastle as Kes
 Sophie Ellerby as Pob

Awards
The show won three BAFTA Television Awards in 2016, for Mini-Series, Supporting Actress for Chanel Cresswell, and Director for Shane Meadows.

Potential sequel set in the year 2000
Although This Is England '90 was previously expected to be the final instalment in the This Is England series, in interviews close to the May 2016 BAFTA awards, Meadows talked about the potential of one final film as a way of "bookending [the series] for cinema and TV", saying "I think there's a film that's left in there ... there is still one little gem in there". He implied this would be a future release to end the series, shown simultaneously in cinemas and on television.

Planning for another film was again confirmed in 2017, although no timescale has been discussed for the project.

In May 2019, while promoting The Virtues with Stephen Graham, Meadows once again talked of a final film "set at the millennium" and which would be entitled This Is England '00 if it were to come to fruition. Although Meadows has not yet written a script for the film, he described the storyline as "an absolute banger". The idea of a sequel has been re-iterated by Shane Meadows as recently as April 2020, who expressed his hope for This Is England '00 to be filmed depicting the following ten years after This Is England '90 for continuity reasons.

References

External links

Shane Meadows website
Warp Films website

Television series set in 1990
2010s British drama television series
2015 British television series debuts
2015 British television series endings
2010s British television miniseries
Channel 4 television dramas
Sequel television series
English-language television shows
Television shows set in Sheffield
Television shows set in South Yorkshire
BAFTA winners (television series)
Live action television shows based on films
This Is England